The 1982–83 Pittsburgh Penguins season was their 16th in the National Hockey League. This was the Penguins worst season to date, winning a meager 18 games and accumulating only 45 points: they finished in last place in the NHL.

General Manager Baz Bastien was killed as a result of an automobile collision on March 15, 1983. The team wore black armbands on their home jerseys for the remainder of the season in his honour.

Offseason

Regular season

Final standings

Schedule and results

|- style="background:#ffc;"
| 1 || Oct 5 || Pittsburgh Penguins || 3–3 || New Jersey Devils || Brendan Byrne Arena || 0–0–1 || 1
|- style="background:#fcf;"
| 2 || Oct 9 || New York Rangers || 5–3 || Pittsburgh Penguins || Civic Arena || 0–1–1 || 1
|- style="background:#fcf;"
| 3 || Oct 10 || Pittsburgh Penguins || 3–4 || Boston Bruins || Boston Garden || 0–2–1 || 1
|- style="background:#cfc;"
| 4 || Oct 12 || Vancouver Canucks || 4–5 || Pittsburgh Penguins || Civic Arena || 1–2–1 || 3
|- style="background:#fcf;"
| 5 || Oct 14 || Pittsburgh Penguins || 0–9 || New York Islanders || Nassau Veterans Memorial Coliseum || 1–3–1 || 3
|- style="background:#fcf;"
| 6 || Oct 16 || New Jersey Devils || 6–5 || Pittsburgh Penguins || Civic Arena || 1–4–1 || 3
|- style="background:#fcf;"
| 7 || Oct 20 || St. Louis Blues || 5–3 || Pittsburgh Penguins || Civic Arena || 1–5–1 || 3
|- style="background:#fcf;"
| 8 || Oct 21 || Pittsburgh Penguins || 4–8 || Quebec Nordiques || Quebec Coliseum || 1–6–1 || 3
|- style="background:#cfc;"
| 9 || Oct 23 || Philadelphia Flyers || 2–4 || Pittsburgh Penguins || Civic Arena || 2–6–1 || 5
|- style="background:#cfc;"
| 10 || Oct 27 || Washington Capitals || 5–7 || Pittsburgh Penguins || Civic Arena || 3–6–1 || 7
|- style="background:#fcf;"
| 11 || Oct 28 || Pittsburgh Penguins || 2–9 || Philadelphia Flyers || The Spectrum || 3–7–1 || 7
|- style="background:#fcf;"
| 12 || Oct 30 || Calgary Flames || 4–1 || Pittsburgh Penguins || Civic Arena || 3–8–1 || 7
|- style="background:#fcf;"
| 13 || Oct 31 || Pittsburgh Penguins || 2–6 || New York Rangers || Madison Square Garden (IV) || 3–9–1 || 7
|-

|- style="background:#cfc;"
| 14 || Nov 2 || Pittsburgh Penguins || 3–1 || New York Islanders || Nassau Veterans Memorial Coliseum || 4–9–1 || 9
|- style="background:#ffc;"
| 15 || Nov 4 || Pittsburgh Penguins || 4–4 || New Jersey Devils || Brendan Byrne Arena || 4–9–2 || 10
|- style="background:#fcf;"
| 16 || Nov 6 || Pittsburgh Penguins || 2–6 || Los Angeles Kings || The Forum || 4–10–2 || 10
|- style="background:#cfc;"
| 17 || Nov 10 || Edmonton Oilers || 4–5 || Pittsburgh Penguins || Civic Arena || 5–10–2 || 12
|- style="background:#fcf;"
| 18 || Nov 13 || Calgary Flames || 3–1 || Pittsburgh Penguins || Civic Arena || 5–11–2 || 12
|- style="background:#ffc;"
| 19 || Nov 14 || Pittsburgh Penguins || 6–6 || Buffalo Sabres || Buffalo Memorial Auditorium || 5–11–3 || 13
|- style="background:#cfc;"
| 20 || Nov 17 || Hartford Whalers || 3–4 || Pittsburgh Penguins || Civic Arena || 6–11–3 || 15
|- style="background:#cfc;"
| 21 || Nov 20 || Boston Bruins || 3–4 || Pittsburgh Penguins || Civic Arena || 7–11–3 || 17
|- style="background:#cfc;"
| 22 || Nov 24 || Toronto Maple Leafs || 3–4 || Pittsburgh Penguins || Civic Arena || 8–11–3 || 19
|- style="background:#ffc;"
| 23 || Nov 26 || Pittsburgh Penguins || 6–6 || Minnesota North Stars || Met Center || 8–11–4 || 20
|- style="background:#fcf;"
| 24 || Nov 27 || Pittsburgh Penguins || 3–5 || St. Louis Blues || The Checkerdome || 8–12–4 || 20
|-

|- style="background:#fcf;"
| 25 || Dec 1 || Chicago Black Hawks || 4–2 || Pittsburgh Penguins || Civic Arena || 8–13–4 || 20
|- style="background:#fcf;"
| 26 || Dec 2 || Pittsburgh Penguins || 4–5 || Washington Capitals || Capital Centre || 8–14–4 || 20
|- style="background:#ffc;"
| 27 || Dec 4 || Philadelphia Flyers || 0–0 || Pittsburgh Penguins || Civic Arena || 8–14–5 || 21
|- style="background:#cfc;"
| 28 || Dec 8 || Buffalo Sabres || 2–4 || Pittsburgh Penguins || Civic Arena || 9–14–5 || 23
|- style="background:#fcf;"
| 29 || Dec 11 || Quebec Nordiques || 7–4 || Pittsburgh Penguins || Civic Arena || 9–15–5 || 23
|- style="background:#fcf;"
| 30 || Dec 12 || Pittsburgh Penguins || 3–4 || Philadelphia Flyers || The Spectrum || 9–16–5 || 23
|- style="background:#ffc;"
| 31 || Dec 15 || Detroit Red Wings || 4–4 || Pittsburgh Penguins || Civic Arena || 9–16–6 || 24
|- style="background:#fcf;"
| 32 || Dec 18 || Washington Capitals || 3–1 || Pittsburgh Penguins || Civic Arena || 9–17–6 || 24
|- style="background:#fcf;"
| 33 || Dec 20 || Pittsburgh Penguins || 3–6 || New York Rangers || Madison Square Garden (IV) || 9–18–6 || 24
|- style="background:#cfc;"
| 34 || Dec 21 || Pittsburgh Penguins || 3–2 || Hartford Whalers || Hartford Civic Center Coliseum || 10–18–6 || 26
|- style="background:#fcf;"
| 35 || Dec 23 || Pittsburgh Penguins || 4–6 || Detroit Red Wings || Joe Louis Arena || 10–19–6 || 26
|- style="background:#cfc;"
| 36 || Dec 26 || New York Rangers || 3–4 || Pittsburgh Penguins || Civic Arena || 11–19–6 || 28
|- style="background:#fcf;"
| 37 || Dec 28 || Pittsburgh Penguins || 3–6 || Washington Capitals || Capital Centre || 11–20–6 || 28
|- style="background:#fcf;"
| 38 || Dec 29 || St. Louis Blues || 6–5 || Pittsburgh Penguins || Civic Arena || 11–21–6 || 28
|-

|- style="background:#cfc;"
| 39 || Jan 1 || New York Islanders || 1–2 || Pittsburgh Penguins || Civic Arena || 12–21–6 || 30
|- style="background:#fcf;"
| 40 || Jan 2 || Pittsburgh Penguins || 1–5 || Montreal Canadiens || Montreal Forum || 12–22–6 || 30
|- style="background:#fcf;"
| 41 || Jan 7 || Pittsburgh Penguins || 2–7 || Edmonton Oilers || Northlands Coliseum || 12–23–6 || 30
|- style="background:#fcf;"
| 42 || Jan 9 || Pittsburgh Penguins || 3–4 || Winnipeg Jets || Winnipeg Arena || 12–24–6 || 30
|- style="background:#fcf;"
| 43 || Jan 12 || Minnesota North Stars || 7–0 || Pittsburgh Penguins || Civic Arena || 12–25–6 || 30
|- style="background:#fcf;"
| 44 || Jan 13 || Pittsburgh Penguins || 1–8 || Philadelphia Flyers || The Spectrum || 12–26–6 || 30
|- style="background:#fcf;"
| 45 || Jan 15 || Montreal Canadiens || 8–7 || Pittsburgh Penguins || Civic Arena || 12–27–6 || 30
|- style="background:#ffc;"
| 46 || Jan 19 || New Jersey Devils || 1–1 || Pittsburgh Penguins || Civic Arena || 12–27–7 || 31
|- style="background:#fcf;"
| 47 || Jan 22 || Quebec Nordiques || 7–3 || Pittsburgh Penguins || Civic Arena || 12–28–7 || 31
|- style="background:#fcf;"
| 48 || Jan 24 || Pittsburgh Penguins || 2–8 || Toronto Maple Leafs || Maple Leaf Gardens || 12–29–7 || 31
|- style="background:#fcf;"
| 49 || Jan 26 || Washington Capitals || 6–2 || Pittsburgh Penguins || Civic Arena || 12–30–7 || 31
|- style="background:#fcf;"
| 50 || Jan 28 || Pittsburgh Penguins || 2–7 || Washington Capitals || Capital Centre || 12–31–7 || 31
|- style="background:#fcf;"
| 51 || Jan 29 || New York Rangers || 2–1 || Pittsburgh Penguins || Civic Arena || 12–32–7 || 31
|- style="background:#fcf;"
| 52 || Jan 31 || Pittsburgh Penguins || 2–3 || New Jersey Devils || Brendan Byrne Arena || 12–33–7 || 31
|-

|- style="background:#fcf;"
| 53 || Feb 2 || Pittsburgh Penguins || 4–7 || Chicago Black Hawks || Chicago Stadium || 12–34–7 || 31
|- style="background:#fcf;"
| 54 || Feb 4 || Pittsburgh Penguins || 4–6 || Winnipeg Jets || Winnipeg Arena || 12–35–7 || 31
|- style="background:#fcf;"
| 55 || Feb 5 || Pittsburgh Penguins || 4–7 || Calgary Flames || Stampede Corral || 12–36–7 || 31
|- style="background:#fcf;"
| 56 || Feb 9 || Vancouver Canucks || 6–2 || Pittsburgh Penguins || Civic Arena || 12–37–7 || 31
|- style="background:#fcf;"
| 57 || Feb 10 || Pittsburgh Penguins || 3–7 || Boston Bruins || Boston Garden || 12–38–7 || 31
|- style="background:#cfc;"
| 58 || Feb 12 || Los Angeles Kings || 4–6 || Pittsburgh Penguins || Civic Arena || 13–38–7 || 33
|- style="background:#fcf;"
| 59 || Feb 15 || Detroit Red Wings || 7–3 || Pittsburgh Penguins || Civic Arena || 13–39–7 || 33
|- style="background:#fcf;"
| 60 || Feb 17 || Pittsburgh Penguins || 1–4 || New York Islanders || Nassau Veterans Memorial Coliseum || 13–40–7 || 33
|- style="background:#fcf;"
| 61 || Feb 19 || Edmonton Oilers || 10–7 || Pittsburgh Penguins || Civic Arena || 13–41–7 || 33
|- style="background:#fcf;"
| 62 || Feb 21 || Pittsburgh Penguins || 2–4 || Toronto Maple Leafs || Maple Leaf Gardens || 13–42–7 || 33
|- style="background:#cfc;"
| 63 || Feb 23 || Winnipeg Jets || 4–6 || Pittsburgh Penguins || Civic Arena || 14–42–7 || 35
|- style="background:#fcf;"
| 64 || Feb 24 || Pittsburgh Penguins || 3–6 || Philadelphia Flyers || The Spectrum || 14–43–7 || 35
|- style="background:#cfc;"
| 65 || Feb 26 || New Jersey Devils || 4–5 || Pittsburgh Penguins || Civic Arena || 15–43–7 || 37
|- style="background:#fcf;"
| 66 || Feb 28 || Pittsburgh Penguins || 3–9 || New York Rangers || Madison Square Garden (IV) || 15–44–7 || 37
|-

|- style="background:#ffc;"
| 67 || Mar 1 || New York Rangers || 3–3 || Pittsburgh Penguins || Civic Arena || 15–44–8 || 38
|- style="background:#fcf;"
| 68 || Mar 4 || Pittsburgh Penguins || 2–10 || Buffalo Sabres || Buffalo Memorial Auditorium || 15–45–8 || 38
|- style="background:#fcf;"
| 69 || Mar 6 || Philadelphia Flyers || 5–3 || Pittsburgh Penguins || Civic Arena || 15–46–8 || 38
|- style="background:#fcf;"
| 70 || Mar 10 || New York Islanders || 4–3 || Pittsburgh Penguins || Civic Arena || 15–47–8 || 38
|- style="background:#cfc;"
| 71 || Mar 12 || Pittsburgh Penguins || 7–2 || Hartford Whalers || Hartford Civic Center Coliseum || 16–47–8 || 40
|- style="background:#fcf;"
| 72 || Mar 13 || Chicago Black Hawks || 4–3 || Pittsburgh Penguins || Civic Arena || 16–48–8 || 40
|- style="background:#fcf;"
| 73 || Mar 16 || Pittsburgh Penguins || 2–3 || Minnesota North Stars || Met Center || 16–49–8 || 40
|- style="background:#cfc;"
| 74 || Mar 19 || Pittsburgh Penguins || 7–4 || Los Angeles Kings || The Forum || 17–49–8 || 42
|- style="background:#fcf;"
| 75 || Mar 21 || Pittsburgh Penguins || 3–7 || Vancouver Canucks || Pacific Coliseum || 17–50–8 || 42
|- style="background:#ffc;"
| 76 || Mar 26 || Pittsburgh Penguins || 4–4 || Washington Capitals || Capital Centre || 17–50–9 || 43
|- style="background:#fcf;"
| 77 || Mar 27 || New York Islanders || 4–1 || Pittsburgh Penguins || Civic Arena || 17–51–9 || 43
|- style="background:#cfc;"
| 78 || Mar 30 || Montreal Canadiens || 2–3 || Pittsburgh Penguins || Civic Arena || 18–51–9 || 45
|-

|- style="background:#fcf;"
| 79 || Apr 2 || Pittsburgh Penguins || 3–6 || New York Islanders || Nassau Veterans Memorial Coliseum || 18–52–9 || 45
|- style="background:#fcf;"
| 80 || Apr 3 || New Jersey Devils || 5–3 || Pittsburgh Penguins || Civic Arena || 18–53–9 || 45
|-

|- style="text-align:center;"
| Legend:       = Win       = Loss       = Tie

Playoffs
The Penguins missed the playoffs, thus ending their four season playoff streak.

Player statistics
Skaters

Goaltenders

†Denotes player spent time with another team before joining the Penguins.  Stats reflect time with the Penguins only.
‡Denotes player was traded mid-season.  Stats reflect time with the Penguins only.

Awards and records
 Paul Baxter established a new franchise record for lowest plus-minus with –51. He topped the previous record of –39 held by Ken Schinkel.
 fewest wins in team history (18; broken in 1983–84)
 fewest points in team history (45; broken in 1983–84)

Transactions

The Penguins were involved in the following transactions during the 1982–83 season:

Trades

Additions and subtractions

Draft picks 

The 1982 NHL Entry Draft was held on June 9, 1982 in Montreal, Quebec.

Farm teams

See also
 1982–83 NHL season

References

 
 Penguins on Hockey Database (Archived 2009-05-13)

External links

Pittsburgh Penguins seasons
Pittsburgh
Pittsburgh
Pitts
Pitts